The Gran Premio Italia was a four-event grand prix competition for Italian skaters, as well as invited foreign skaters based in Italy. Skaters were selected to appear at either one or two events, and the highest scoring skaters qualified for the final. Medals were awarded in the disciplines of men's singles, ladies' singles, pair skating, and junior and senior ice dance.

Competitions 
On the 7th November 2020, the FISG announced that the second stage had been postponed until January 2021, making it the fourth stage of the Gran Premio.

Preliminary Assignments 
The preliminary assignments were announced by the FISG on October 7, 2020.

Men

Ladies

Pairs

Ice Dance

Junior Ice Dance

Changes to Preliminary Assignments

First Stage

Second Stage

Third Stage

Fourth Stage

Medalists

Qualification 
At each event, skaters earned points toward qualification for the final and at the conclusion of the Fourth Stage, the FISG announced the athletes who had qualified to the final.  The top 6 ladies, 4 men, 3 pairs, 2 ice dance and 3 junior ice dance teams qualified for the final. The points earned per placement were as follows: 

In the event of a tie, the skater or team who earned the best placement would advance. If there was a further tie, the best total score would be taken into account.

Qualification standings 
The following skaters have qualified to the final.

Full Results

First Stage

Men

Ladies

Pairs

Second Stage

Men

Ladies

Pairs

Third Stage

Ladies

Ice Dance

Junior Ice Dance

Fourth Stage

Ladies

Ice Dance

Junior Ice Dance

Final

Men

Ladies

Pairs

Ice Dance

Junior Ice Dance

References 

Figure skating in Italy